The Leuscheid is a mainly wooded hill ridge on the border between the German states of North Rhine-Westphalia and Rhineland-Palatinate in the extreme north of the Westerwald range. From a natural region perspective, however, it is not seen as part of the Westerwald natural region but belongs to the Mittelsieg Upland (major unit 330) and thus to the Süderbergland (major unit group 33).

References

External links
 BfN-Landschaftssteckbrief Südliches Mittelsieg-Bergland (Leuscheid and Nister Upland)
 Landschaftssteckbrief Leuscheid - Landschaftsinformationssystem der Naturschutzverwaltung Rheinland-Pfalz
 Photos of the Wohmbach valley

Rhein-Sieg-Kreis
Natural regions of the Süder Uplands
Regions of the Westerwald
Geography of North Rhine-Westphalia
 Geography of Rhineland-Palatinate